How You Look to Me is a 2005 American drama film directed by J. Miller Tobin and starring Frank Langella and Laura Allen.

Plot

Cast
Frank Langella as Professor Driskoll
Laura Allen as Jane Carol Webb

References

External links
 
 

2005 films
American drama films
2005 drama films
2000s English-language films
2000s American films